Stoke Newington is a London Overground station on the Lea Valley lines, serving the Stoke Newington area of the London Borough of Hackney. Its three-letter station code is SKW and it is in Travelcard zone 2.

The station is on the Seven Sisters branch of the Lea Valley Lines, with services out of Liverpool Street running to either Cheshunt or Enfield Town in the north.

A smoked glass/steel-framed ticket office was built in the early 1980s to replace the original ticket hall on the same site. The platforms are located in a narrow cutting and are accessed by uncovered concrete staircases also installed at this time.

In 2015 the station transferred to London Overground operation and was added to the Tube map.

Services
Trains are operated by London Overground.

The typical off-peak weekday service pattern from Stoke Newington is:

Connections

London Buses routes 67, 76, 106, 149, 243, 393 and 476 and night route N73 serve the station.

References

External links

Railway stations in the London Borough of Hackney
Former Great Eastern Railway stations
Railway stations served by London Overground
Railway station
Railway stations in Great Britain opened in 1872